Alfons Higl (born 17 December 1964 in Aindling) is a German football coach and a former player.

Personal life
Higl's son Felix is a professional footballer who plays as a forward for VfL Osnabrück.

Honours
 DFB-Pokal finalist: 1990–91
 Bundesliga runner-up: 1989–90

References

External links
 
 

1964 births
Living people
Association football defenders
German footballers
FC Augsburg players
SC Freiburg players
1. FC Köln players
SC Fortuna Köln players
Bundesliga players
2. Bundesliga players
German football managers
FC Augsburg managers
VfB Stuttgart non-playing staff
West German footballers
Association football coaches